Anne Marie Mayes (August 30, 1964 – January 25, 2011) was an American material science and engineer and a Toyota professor at Massachusetts Institute of Technology (MIT), and MacVicar faculty fellow until 2006. She was the first woman to be promoted from assistant professor to tenured professor in the Department of Materials Science and Engineering at MIT. Mayes focused her research on lithium polymer batteries and the role of polymers in environmental issues. The Anne M. Mayes '86 Fellowship for graduate students at MIT is named in her honor.

Early life and education 
Mayes was born in Aurora, Illinois to parents Leon S. Mayes and Sybil J. Mayes (née Knaus).

Mayes graduated Mustang High School in  Mustang, Oklahoma in 1982.  After graduation, Mayes went on to study and earn a Bachelor of Science in Materials Science and Engineering from Massachusetts Institute of Technology(MIT) in 1986. She obtained her Ph.D. in Materials Science and Engineering from Northwestern University in 1991. At Northwestern University, Mayes was advised by Monica Olvera de la Cruz. Her Ph.D. research focused phase diagram of block copolymers. After completing her Ph.D., Mayes worked two years as visiting scientist at IBM's Alameda Research Center with Thomas P. Russell.

Career and research 
In 1993 Mayes joined MIT as an assistant professor in the Department of Materials Science and Engineering. In 1997 she became the first female professor to receive tenure in the Department of Materials Science and Engineering at MIT.

Mayes research led to breakthroughs in many topics, including the development of polymeric electrolytes for lithium-ion batteries, cell-signaling biomaterials, membranes for water purification, block copolymer films for nanolithography, and weak polyelectrolyte multilayer assemblies. One of her major development was “baroplastics,” a plastic that becomes soft under pressure, which allowed for recycling with less energy and without degradation.

In 2006 Mayes retired early from MIT due to illness and helped create the Anne M. Mayes '86 Fellowship for graduate students with her remaining discretionary funds.

Overall, Mayes supervised sixteen Ph.D. candidates, seven M.S. degrees, and a host of undergraduate researchers. Mayes had 13 patents, over 100 publications. Beyond research, she was dedicated to her students in the classroom, for this she was named a MacVicar faculty fellow in "recognition of her outstanding teaching innovations" and other teaching awards.

Awards and honors 

 2007 Carl S. Marvel Creative Polymer Chemistry Award
 2004 Neutron Scattering Society of America Exceptional Service Award
 2003 Fellow of the American Physical Society
 2003-2006 Toyota Chair, MIT
 2003 OMNOVA Solutions Signature University Award for Outstanding Research in Polymers
 2002 Materials Research Society Woody Award
 2001-2006 MIT MacVicar Faculty Fellow
 1999 John H. Dillon Medal of the American Physical Society  
 1998 Materials Research Society Outstanding Young Investigator Award

Personal life 
In 1994 Mayes was diagnosed with breast cancer. When three surgeries and intense chemotherapy failed, she underwent a clinical trial that eradicated the cancer in 1997 but left her immune system compromised.

Anne Mayes was married to fellow MIT Professor Donald Sadoway for a period of time while they were both at MIT.

Mayes married Glenn Mailand in 2004. After Mayes retired from MIT in 2006, she moved back to her hometown of Mustang, Oklahoma. Mayes died on January 25, 2011, after a battle with pulmonary fibrosis resulting from her cancer treatment.

References

External links 

 Audio interview

1964 births
2011 deaths
American materials scientists
MIT School of Engineering alumni
Northwestern University alumni
MIT School of Engineering faculty
Scientists from Oklahoma
Fellows of the American Physical Society
Women materials scientists and engineers